Sonia Jackson Myles is the Founder/CEO of The Accord Group LLC and the President, CEO and Treasurer of The Sister Accord Foundation.

Education 

Myles holds a Bachelor of Science Degree and a Master of Business Administration Degree from Florida A&M University (FAMU) and graduated summa cum laude.

Career 
Myles has served as an advisor and executive coach to numerous Fortune companies and startups, working with CEOs and their teams on leadership development; growth strategies to diversity, particularly in the areas of MBE development, unconscious bias training, and women's initiatives; change management; employee engagement; and creating a culture where employees can thrive. Myles managed over $20 billion with Ford Motor Company, The Gillette Company and Procter & Gamble.

Myles launched The Sister Accord Africa – The Winners Circle to help meet her goal of having one billion girls and women learn how to love themselves and each other. The first Sister Accord Chapter was established in Harare, Zimbabwe.

Myles is also the author of The Sister Accord: 51 Ways to Love Your Sister and 51 Ways to Love Your Children.

Awards 
1. Nominated for a NAACP Image Award, in the Debut Author category for her book, The Sister Accord: 51 Ways to LOVE Your Sister and was honored with an Exemplary Achievement Award from The State of Ohio Senate for The Sister Accord (2013)

2. President’s Award-NE Minority Supplier Development Council

3. 2008 Essence Magazine “Women Of Power”

4. 2011 FAMU School Of Business Hall Of Fame

5. YWCA Career Women Of Achievement Honoree

6. CPS Superintendent Laura Mitchell’s SHERO Award

7. Legacy Award from The National Association For Female Executives

References 

Living people
Year of birth missing (living people)
American women chief executives
Florida A&M University alumni